The South Africa women's national cricket team toured England in July and August 2008. They first played Ireland in 1 One Day Internationals and 1 Twenty20 International, winning both matches. They then played a 5 match ODI series and a 3 match T20I series against England, both of which were won by England.

Squads

Only ODI: Ireland v South Africa

Only T20I: Ireland v South Africa

Tour Match: England Development Squad v South Africa

WODI Series

1st ODI

2nd ODI

3rd ODI

4th ODI

5th ODI

WT20I Series

1st T20I

2nd T20I

3rd T20I

References

External links
South Africa Women tour of England 2008 from Cricinfo

International cricket competitions in 2008
2008 in women's cricket
Women's cricket tours of England
South Africa women's national cricket team tours